Bayville is an unincorporated community located within Berkeley Township in Ocean County, New Jersey, United States. The area is served as United States Postal Service ZIP Code 08721. As of the 2010 United States Census, the population for ZIP Code Tabulation Area (ZCTA) 08721 was 20,512. Central Regional High School is the local high school for the area.

Bayville is home to Double Trouble State Park, the site of an Ocean Spray cranberry bog. The area is said to be haunted by the Jersey Devil.

Bayville received  of snow in the January 2022 North American blizzard, the most of any place in the state.

Notable people 
People who were born in, residents of, or otherwise closely associated with Bayville include:
 Jazmyn Foberg (born 2000), artistic gymnast who was the 2014 US Junior National All-Around and Uneven Bars Champion.
 Al Leiter (born 1965), baseball pitcher.
 Phil Longo (born 1968), American football coach who is offensive coordinator and quarterbacks coach for the North Carolina Tar Heels football team.
 Megan McCafferty (born 1973), author best known for her Jessica Darling series.

References

External links 
Bayville, NJ Community web site

Berkeley Township, New Jersey
Populated places in the Pine Barrens (New Jersey)
Unincorporated communities in Ocean County, New Jersey
Unincorporated communities in New Jersey